Stagecoach West Scotland is an operating region of Stagecoach UK Bus, comprising Western Buses Ltd  based in Ayr, Scotland.

Operations
Stagecoach West Scotland operates in west central and southwest Scotland, in an area bounded by Largs and Braehead to the north, Hamilton to the east, Stranraer and Lockerbie to the south and the Isle of Arran to the west. Frequent express services also reach Glasgow and Edinburgh from throughout Ayrshire & the X74 and 101 from Dumfries.

Stagecoach West Scotland operates under Stagecoach Western which is the prevalent brand and is used for the vast majority of bus operations throughout the West Scotland region. Most Stagecoach Western branded vehicles wear the old Stagecoach corporate livery of red, blue, orange and white, while the remainder wear the new Stagecoach corporate liveries. It is the principal trading name of Western Buses Ltd.

The company also provide vehicles for Scottish Citylink express work, mainly on the Glasgow to Edinburgh corridor, and also for Megabus, mainly running from Aberdeen to London.

Stagecoach West Scotland had faced sustained competition from the FirstGroup between Ardrossan and Kilmarnock since Stagecoach launched its network of Glasgow city services in the heart of First's Glasgow operating territory in 1997, though First withdrew from Ayrshire in October 2005 leaving Stagecoach the sole dominant operator once again. While minor competition existed for several years from T & E Docherty around Irvine, Stagecoach has since purchased the routes and vehicles used by that operator. Minor competition exists from Shuttle Buses between Irvine and Girdle Toll (including local operation around Kilmarnock and Irvine) along with competition in the Irvine area from Bennetts of Kilwinning, JAS Transport around the Ardrossan, West Kilbride and Largs areas and also McGill's Bus Services between Largs and Greenock.

At both the 2005 and 2006 UK Bus Awards, Stagecoach West Scotland took the top award of 'UK Bus Operator of the Year', having narrowly missed out on the prize in 2004. It also received the 'Best Large Fleet Operator' award at the industry ceremony for both years.

History 

Stagecoach arrived in the west of Scotland when it purchased Western Scottish Omnibuses Ltd of Kilmarnock for £6 million in July 1994. Western Scottish was, at that time, owned by its management and employees, who had purchased the company from the state-owned Scottish Bus Group in October 1991 on the breakup and privatisation of that concern.

Stagecoach wasted no time in expanding its operations in the west of Scotland, and in October 1994 purchased the small Arran Transport business based in Brodick, on the Isle Of Arran. In January 1995 Western took over the operations of A1 Service of Ardrossan, bringing with it around 75 vehicles and the company's operations in the towns of Ardrossan, Saltcoats, Stevenston and Kilwinning, together with the very busy and frequent Ardrossan to Kilmarnock service. Though for a time the former A1 Service operations were under the separate legal entity of Stagecoach (A1 Service) Ltd, that company has since been absorbed by Western Buses.

Clyde Coast Coaches of Ardrossan, a previous competitor to Western Scottish in services around Kilmarnock, sold its bus operations to Western in 1995, adding services from Saltcoats to Largs and Beith to the Western portfolio.

The last 'big' purchase Stagecoach Western has made to date was that of AA Buses - the bus operations of Dodd's Of Troon, in summer 1997. At the same time the bus operations of Shuttle Buses of Kilwinning were also absorbed (note Shuttle Buses have since restarted local bus operation, though mainly restricted to tendered services). This would add local bus operation around Irvine, Stewarton and Troon, and would consolidate the Stagecoach Western operation, securing it as the dominant operator in north Ayrshire, a role Western Scottish never succeeded in filling.

Stagecoach operated in Glasgow as Magic Bus in the late 1980s using old London AEC Routemaster buses, though it sold the operation to Kelvin Central Buses in the early 1990s. After a stillborn attempt in 1995 to purchase KCB, Stagecoach settled for a 20% stake in competitor Strathclyde Buses who purchased KCB), the present Stagecoach Glasgow operations were launched in 1997, after Strathclyde Buses sold to FirstGroup, and offered fast, direct and frequent services from Glasgow City Centre to Easterhouse, Castlemilk, Pollok, Darnley, East Kilbride and Cumbernauld. 

The Pollok and Darnley routes were express services which made good use of the new M77 motorway in the area and used new low floor vehicles. However, due to First Glasgow's new operations in Stagecoach's key Ayrshire and Fife markets Stagecoach decided to scale down operations in the area. It acquired Arriva Scotland West's 49% stake in Paisley company Dart Buses. Dart took over operation of the Pollok and Darnley services, which were closer to its base in Paisley and more in fitting with the rest of its west of Glasgow motorway express services. Stagecoach supplied vehicles to operate the routes, which continued under the Stagecoach Glasgow livery and brand, while several Dart vehicles were repainted into the Stagecoach corporate livery. Dart Buses ran into financial trouble early in the new millennium and without notice ceased operations overnight in October 2001. First registered the defunct company's motorway services before either Arriva or Stagecoach could, and as such Stagecoach decided not to restart operations.

The East Kilbride services were soon withdrawn, some regarding the timetabling of it as optimistic, and the remaining operations were rebranded as the "no-frills" Magic Bus with rock bottom fares and older vehicles. The Castlemilk operation was taken over by FirstGroup in June 2005 who until January 2006 kept the old Stagecoach service 175 running alongside its own 75 service. Vehicles in the Magic Bus operation wear a deep blue livery with bright yellow lettering, complete with slogans "It's magic!" and "It goes roon the toon!" (sic), the latter imitating the Glasgow dialect. Though the Ballieston service was withdrawn during summer 2006, the Easterhouse service is still operated, though now by Stagecoach in Glasgow branded vehicles, the Magic Bus brand having been dropped in the city.

In July 2004, Stagecoach announced the acquisition of the M8 Motorvator Glasgow to Edinburgh express service from Lanarkshire firm, Longs Coaches. This pitched Stagecoach in fierce and direct competition from Scottish Citylink, a company Stagecoach ironically operated vehicles for under a franchise agreement. Stagecoach continued to use the distinctive M8 Motorvator brand on this route, with vehicles wearing a red and off-white livery, and was operated by Stagecoach Glasgow Ltd. Some seats on the Motorvator service were available for purchase through the low-cost Stagecoach subsidiary Megabus. Both companies offered fast, frequent and affordable express services along the M8 motorway corridor between the two Scottish cities, a situation that continued until 13 September 2005. On that date, Stagecoach and Citylink parent company ComfortDelGro announced a joint venture in the provision of express coach services in Scotland. Under the terms of the agreement, Stagecoach would take a 35% stake in Citylink in return for certain rights to the Megabus brand in Scotland. This ended competition between the two operators and the withdrawal of the Motorvator brand. Stagecoach has resumed operating vehicles for Citylink under a franchise agreement, and many vehicles that operated as Motorvator now wear Citylink livery. However this sale is being investigated by the office of fair trading.

During 2006, Stagecoach introduced several new express services, including the short-lived X33 from Ayr to Paisley later extended to Braehead Shopping Centre, of which part of the route from Ayr to Paisley was originally operated by Western until the 1970s, albeit using a slightly different route. The X33 service was the first time the company had strayed into the heartlands of 'Clydeside' Another new service was the X16 connecting Ayr with Hamilton and East Kilbride via Kilmarnock, although between 2020 and 2022, the X16 was cut in half to serve between Ayr and Kilmarnock due to low passenger usage, then the X16 was withdrawn completely among a number of service cuts from 17 July 2022.

Depots
Stagecoach West Scotland has depots in Brodick(Isle of Arran), Ardrossan, Kilmarnock, Ayr, Cumbernauld, Stranraer and Dumfries.

Ardrossan (Harbour Road)
Ayr (Waggon Road)
Muirkirk (outstation of Ayr and Kilmarnock)
Brodick (The Pier) (Isle Of Arran)
Cumbernauld (Glencyran Road)
Dumfries (Eastfield Road)
Kirkcudbright (outstation of Dumfries)
Sanquhar (outstation of Dumfries)
Biggar (outstation of Dumfries)
Stranraer (outstation of Dumfries) 
Whithorn (outstation of Dumfries)
Kilmarnock (Mackinlay Place)

Fleet
As of July 2019, Stagecoach West Scotland operates 359 buses and coaches.

Stagecoach West Scotland is among the Stagecoach Group's major operators of battery electric buses in Scotland, operating 15 BYD Alexander Dennis Enviro200EV and 6 Volvo 7900e buses in and around Kilmarnock, the latter Volvos being partially funded by SP Energy Networks as the UK's first electric buses serving rural communities. 25 single-deck Volvo BZLs and a further two Enviro200 EVs began to be delivered for Ayrshire services in February 2023, part of an order for 39 electric buses for West Scotland throughout 2023, funded by the Scottish Zero Emission Bus (ScotZEB) challenge fund.

See also

Western Scottish
Stagecoach Group

References

External links 

Stagecoach Group bus operators in Scotland
Ayr
Transport in Glasgow
Transport in North Ayrshire
Transport in East Ayrshire
Transport in South Ayrshire
Transport in Dumfries and Galloway